The  Ministry of Finance (Artho Montronaloya) is a ministry of Bangladesh. The ministry is responsible for state finance, including the state budget, taxation and economic policy in Bangladesh. It is led by the Finance Minister of Bangladesh. The department must report to the Parliament of Bangladesh. It contains four divisions:
Finance Division
Economic Relations Division
Internal Resources Division
Bank and Financial Institutions Division

Directorate
i) Finance Division:
Office of the Controller General of Accounts
Investment Corporation of Bangladesh
The Security Printing Corporation (Bangladesh) Ltd.
Financial Management Reform Program
Comptroller and Auditor General of Bangladesh
Bangladesh House Building Finance Corporation
Pay and Services Commission 2013
National Savings Certificate (Bangladesh)
ii) Economic Relations Division	
iii) Internal Resources Division	
Bangladesh Customs
Chittagong Custom House
National Board of Revenue
National Savings Directorate
Dhaka Custom House
iv) Bank and Financial Institutions Division	
Chittagong Stock Exchange
Dhaka Stock Exchange
Palli Karma-Sahayak Foundation (PKSF)
Bangladesh Institute of Bank Management
Bangladesh Bank
Bangladesh Securities and Exchange Commission
Bangladesh Insurance Development and Regulatory Authority
Microcredit Regulatory Authority
Sonali Bank Limited
Agrani Bank Limited
Rupali Bank Limited
Janata Bank Limited
Bangladesh Krishi Bank
Rajshahi Agricultural Development Bank
Sadharan Bima Corporation
Jiban Bima Corporation

List of Secretaries of Finance
 Khandaker Asaduzzaman
 Mohammad Matiul Islam
 Kafil Uddin Mahmud
 Abul Khair
 M. Syeduzzaman
 Mustafizur  Rahman
 Golam Kibria
 M. K. Anwar
 Khorshed Alam
 Nasimuddin Ahmed
 Akbar Ali Khan
 Zakir Ahmed Khan
 Siddique ur Rahman Chowdhury
 Dr. Mohammad Tareq
 Fazle Kabir
 Mahbub Ahmed
 Hedayetullah Al Mamun
 Mohammad Muslim Chowdhury
 Abdur Rouf Talukder
 Fatima Yasmin

See also
Financial Management Reform Programme
Cabinet Committee on Public Purchase

References

 
Finance
Bangladesh